Paul Winters (born 1994) is an Irish hurler who plays for Dublin Senior Championship club St. Brigid's. He is a former member of the Dublin senior hurling team, with whom he usually lined out as a forward.

Career

A member of the St. Brigid's club in Castleknock, Winters first came to prominence on the inter-county scene during a two-year tenure with the Dublin minor team. A back-to-back All-Ireland runner-up in this grade, he later had a two-year stint with the Dublin under-21 team while also lining out with Maynooth University in the Fitzgibbon Cup. Winters joined the Dublin senior hurling team in 2014 and was a regular member of the team until 2019.

Honours

Dublin
Walsh Cup: 2016
Leinster Minor Hurling Championship: 2011, 2012

References

1994 births
Living people
St Brigid's (Dublin) hurlers
Dublin inter-county hurlers